Mary Lynn Carlin (née Reynolds) is an American former actress. She is best known for her debut role in the film Faces (1968), for which she was nominated for an Academy Award.

Life and career
She was born in Los Angeles, the daughter of socialite Muriel Elizabeth (née Ansley) and Laurence 'Larry' Reynolds. Her father was a Hollywood business manager, and her mother worked in radio. She grew up in Laguna Beach.

Carlin, a secretary-turned-actress, earned her only Academy Award nomination in 1968 for her first feature role, as John Marley's suicidal wife, Maria, in John Cassavetes' Faces (1968). She is the first nonprofessional to be nominated for an Academy Award. She subsequently played wives and mothers before retiring in 1987. She next appeared in ...tick...tick...tick... (1970), as George Kennedy's ambitious, henpecking wife, and returned to the offbeat as Buck Henry's wife, searching for her missing daughter amid the hippies and drug culture of 1970s New York in Miloš Forman's Taking Off (1971). The same year she appeared in Blake Edwards' western Wild Rovers. In 1972, she was re-teamed with John Marley, again as his wife, in Bob Clark's Vietnam-era horror film Deathdream, and her other film roles include the British drama film Baxter! (1973) as the mother of Scott Jacoby, the 1979 comedy French Postcards, and the 1982 horror film Superstition.

The small screen saw Carlin cast for her maternal presence as well. She is perhaps best remembered as the parent of growing teen Lance Kerwin in the TV-movie James at 15 (1977) and its subsequent spin-off, James at 16. In 1977, she was cast in several episodes of The Waltons as a nurse who marries the county sheriff. She appeared in the 1976 miniseries Rich Man, Poor Man Book II, and had a recurring role on the short-lived television series, Strike Force (1981–82). She appeared in several other TV movies, providing a strong supporting turn in Silent Night, Lonely Night. In 1972, she appeared in an episode of Gunsmoke titled "Milligan" as the wife of Harry Morgan's character.

In 1971, she played the mother of teenage father Desi Arnaz Jr. in Mr. and Mrs. Bo Jo Jones. That same year she played Peter Falk's wife in A Step Out of Line. In 1974, she appeared in both Terror on the 40th Floor and The Morning After. She played the wife of Sam Houston in the biopic, The Honorable Sam Houston, in 1975. The following year she played Eve Plumb's mother in Dawn: Portrait of a Teenage Runaway.

In her last made-for-television movie, she played the mother of three young men manipulated into breaking their father (Robert Mitchum) out of jail in A Killer in the Family (1983). Her last acting role was a guest appearance on Murder, She Wrote in 1987, as the wife of the episode's murder victim, played by Cornel Wilde.

Personal life
Carlin was married to Peter Hall from 1958 until their divorce in 1960. Her second marriage was to Edward Carlin, with whom she had two children. That union (1963–74) also ended in divorce. Her oldest child is podcaster/journalist Dan Carlin. She was married to John Wolfe from 1983 until his death in 1999.

Filmography

Films 
 Faces (1968) - Maria
 ...tick...tick...tick... (1970) - Julia Little
 A Step Out of Line (1971)  - Linda Connors
 Taking Off (1971) - Lynn Tyne
 Wild Rovers (1971) - Sada Billings
 Mr. and Mrs. Bo Jo Jones (1971) - Mrs. Jones
 Baxter! (1973) - Scott Jacoby mother
 The Morning After (1974) - Fran Lester
 Deathdream (1974) - Christine Brooks
 Terror on the 40th Floor (1974) - Lee Parker
 The Honorable Sam Houston (1975) - Margaret Houston
 The Lives of Jenny Dolan (1975) - Nancy Royce
 Dawn: Portrait of a Teenage Runaway (1976) - Dawn's Mother
 French Postcards (1979) - Mrs. Weber
 Battle Beyond the Stars (1980) - Nell (voice)
 The Kid from Nowhere (1982) - Molly Edward
 Superstition (1982) - Melinda Leahy
 A Killer in the Family (1983) - Dorothy Tison

TV series 
 Rich Man, Poor Man Book II (1976) - Sarah Hunt
 The Waltons (1975-1977) - Sara Griffith Bridges / Eula Mae
 James at 15 (1977-1978) - Meg Hunter
 Strike Force (1981) - Lorraine Klein

Awards and nominations

References

External links
 

Living people
American film actresses
American television actresses
Actresses from Los Angeles
20th-century American actresses
21st-century American women
Year of birth missing (living people)